Shanice is a female given name, derived from the Hebrew Yôchânân, meaning “God is gracious”.

Popularity 
The name Shanice rose to popularity in the United States in the 1990s, likely spurred on by the rise of the singer Shanice Wilson. In 1992, it was the 162nd most popular name for girls, with 1,859 births.

Notable people 

 Shanice (born 1973), American singer-songwriter, actress, and dancer
 Shanice Williams (born 1996), American actress and singer
 Shanice van de Sanden (born 1992), Dutch footballer
 Shanice Stephens, head coach of the University of North Texas women's basketball team
 Shanice Craft (born 1993), German athlete
 Shanice Love (born 1997), Jamaican athlete
 Shanice Parker (born 1998), Australian rugby league footballer
 Shanice Beckford (born 1995), Jamaican netball player

References 

Given names
Hebrew-language given names